Great Xia may refer to:

Daxia, the name given in antiquity by the Han Chinese to Bactria
Ming Xia, a Chinese dynasty
Western Xia, an imperial dynasty of China
Xia (Sixteen Kingdoms), a dynastic state of Xiongnu